Reporter is a 2009 documentary film about the work of New York Times columnist Nicholas D. Kristof in the Democratic Republic of Congo.  Executive produced by Ben Affleck and directed by Eric Daniel Metzgar, the HBO movie captures life in the war-ravaged African country and specifically focuses on the challenges faced by international correspondents in covering the region's crises.

Production
The documentary was filmed during the summer of 2007, when Kristof traveled to eastern Congo with Leana Wen, then an American medical student, and Will Okun, a high school teacher from Chicago.  Wen and Okun were chosen to travel with Kristof as winners of the Second Annual Win A Trip with Nick Kristof contest, held in 2007 by The New York Times.

Release
Reporter premiered at the 2009 Sundance Film Festival and aired on HBO on February 18, 2010.

Reception
In reviewing the film, Entertainment Weekly wrote: "In Reporter, he's a compelling figure, a cross between Mother Teresa and the James Woods character in Salvador, and what seals the intensity of his job is the danger." The Washington Post observed, "Ideally, [Kristof] hopes to teach his companions, who won a contest to travel with him, about the value of witnessing the world's atrocities and scintillating them into stories that will call on people to act."

Reporter was nominated for the Grand Jury Prize at the 2009 Sundance Film Festival.

References

External links
 
 

2009 documentary films
American documentary films
2009 films
Documentary films about journalists
Documentary films about war correspondents
HBO documentary films
2000s English-language films
2000s American films
English-language documentary films